The Colonist was a weekly English-language tabloid newspaper published in Sydney from 1835 to 1840.

History
The Colonist was founded by John Dunmore Lang with a religious and political agenda. First published on 1 January 1835 by Henry Bull and J. Spilsbury, The Colonist was published from 1835 until 1840, after which it was absorbed by the Sydney Herald.

Digitisation
The paper has been digitised as part of the Australian Newspapers Digitisation Program project of the National Library of Australia.

See also
 List of newspapers in Australia
 List of defunct newspapers of Australia
 List of newspapers in New South Wales

References

External links
 
 Press timeline: Select chronology of significant Australian press events to 2011
 Isaacs, Victor, Kirkpatrick, Rod and Russell, John (2004). Australian Newspaper History: A Bibliography

Defunct newspapers published in Sydney
Publications established in 1835
Publications disestablished in 1840
1835 establishments in Australia